"Blind" is the first single from the eponymous debut album by Hercules and Love Affair.

Writing and inspiration
"Blind" was written by Anohni and Andrew Butler.  The song began as a poem by Butler before it was recorded by Anohni.

Critical reception
Jacob Wright of Resident Advisor commented that the song is "accessible," yet is "new and ambitious and different, and it has quality."

The Chicago Maroon placed "Blind" at #2 on the Top 5 Songs of 2008.  "Blind" ranked at #2 on the 10 Best Singles of 2008 list by American magazine Entertainment Weekly.  Mother Jones ranked "Blind" at #14 on The Best Singles of 2008.  Likewise, NME placed "Blind" at #18 on the Top 50 Singles of 2008. Pitchfork Media placed "Blind" at #1 on The 100 Best Tracks of 2008 and at #18 on The Top 500 Tracks of the 2000s. PopMatters placed "Blind" at #8 on The Best Singles of 2008.   Resident Advisor voted "Blind" at #6 on the Top 30 Tracks of 2008 and at #18 on the Top 100 Tracks of the 2000s.  Rolling Stone placed "Blind" at #77 on the 100 Best Singles of 2008.  Slant Magazine placed "Blind" at #4 on the Top 25 Singles of 2008 and at #16 on the Best of the Aughts: Singles.  Spin placed "Blind" at #19 on The 20 Best Songs of 2008.  In October 2011, NME placed it at number 128 on its list 150 Best Tracks of the Past 15 Years.

Music video
The music video for "Blind" was directed by Saam Farahmand. The video features English actress Jaime Winstone. Winstone is seen walking through a Greek ritualistic orgy. Doric columns and a lot of swirling mist are seen throughout the video.

Track listings

UK CD single
 "Blind (Radio Edit)" – 3:47
 "Shadows" – 4:19
 "Blind (Frankie Knuckles Vocal)" – 7:54
 "Blind (Hercules Club Mix)" – 7:00

iTunes EP
 "Blind" – 6:16
 "Shadows" – 4:15
 "Blind (Frankie Knuckles Remix)" – 7:51
 "Blind (Serge Santiago Version)" – 10:48
 "Blind (Hercules Club Mix)" – 6:56
 "Blind (Frankie Knuckles Dub)" – 8:09

Song usage
"Blind (Serge Santiago Version)" appeared on the mix album FabricLive.41 by Simian Mobile Disco.

Charts

Nominations

See also
List of post-disco artists and songs

References

2008 singles
Post-disco songs